Wolfpack or wolf pack may refer to:

 Pack (canine), a group of canids that live, feed, and travel together as a family group

Entertainment

Music
 Wolfpack (DJs), a Belgian DJ and music production duo
 Wolfbrigade, formerly Wolfpack, a Swedish crust punk band
Wolfpack (EP), a 2013 EP by Hopes Die Last
 "Wolfpack", a demo and song by DYS
 "Wolf Pack", a song by The Vaccines from the album What Did You Expect from The Vaccines?
 "Wolfpack", a song by Syd Barrett from the album Barrett
 "The Wolfpack", a song by Angels & Airwaves from the album The Dream Walker
 "The Wolfpack", a song by Satyricon from the album The Age of Nero
 "Wolfpack", a song by the Swedish metal band Sabaton from the album Primo Victoria

Video games
 Wolfpack Studios, a video game company based in Austin, Texas
 Wolfpack (video game), a 1990 submarine computer game
 AFO Wolfpack, one of two main AFOs in the 2010 video game Medal of Honor
 An official nickname associated with eSports team Denial eSports

Other
The Wolfpack, a 2015 documentary film
Wolf Pack (TV series), a 2023 American television series from Paramount+
 Wolfpack, a Battletech novel written by Robert N. Charrette
 Wolfpack (Marvel Comics), a Marvel Comics title during the 1980s
 nWo Wolfpac, a subgroup within the New World Order professional wrestling stable
 Teenage Wolfpack, a 1956 German film released in the UK as Wolfpack

Military 
 Wolfpack (naval tactic), a system of submarine warfare used by the Kriegsmarine of Germany and the U.S. Navy during World War II
 Wolfpack (squadron), a U.S. Navy fighter squadron
 8th Fighter Wing, a U.S. Air Force unit nicknamed "Wolfpack"
 HMH-466, a U.S. Marine Corps helicopter squadron known as the Wolfpack
 3rd Light Armored Reconnaissance Battalion, a U.S. Marine Corps unit known as "The Wolfpack"
 HSL-45, a U.S. Navy Helicopter Anti-Submarine Squadron known as the Wolfpack; see List of units of the United States Navy

Sports 
 Toronto Wolfpack, Canadian professional rugby league team
 Prairie Wolf Pack, Canadian rugby union team
 NC State Wolfpack,  the collegiate athletic teams that represent North Carolina State University
 Nevada Wolf Pack,  the collegiate athletic teams that represent University of Nevada, Reno
 Loyola Wolf Pack,  the collegiate athletic teams that represent Loyola University New Orleans
 Thompson Rivers WolfPack,  the collegiate athletic teams that represent Thompson Rivers University in Kamloops, British Columbia
 Wisconsin Wolfpack, an American football franchise based in Wisconsin
 Hartford Wolf Pack (formerly known as the Connecticut Whale), an ice hockey team in the American Hockey League
 Portland Wolfpack, a team in the now-defunct International Fight League and based in Portland, Oregon
 Lillehammer Wolfpack, an American football team based in Lillehammer, Norway
 BMS Herlev Wolfpack, a Danish basketball team
 The Wolf Pack, a nickname for the Finland men's national basketball team
 The Wolfpack, nickname of the Deceuninck–Quick-Step cycling team
 The Wolf Pack, fanclub of Milwaukee Brewer pitcher Randy Wolf
 Wolfpack, a former group of devoted fans of the Kansas City Chiefs in the 1960s
 Saint Ignatius Wolfpack, the high school athletic teams that represent Saint Ignatius College Prep High School in Chicago.

Other uses 
 Wolfpack, the codename for Microsoft Cluster Server
 La Manada sexual abuse case, Spanish legal case, colloquially known in English as the San Fermin wolf pack case
 Wolf-PAC, American nonpartisan political action committee

See also